Stonington is an unincorporated community in Bono Township, Lawrence County, Indiana.

Stonington took its name from the local Stone Mill.

Geography

References

Unincorporated communities in Lawrence County, Indiana
Unincorporated communities in Indiana